Bernardo de Irigoyen is a city in the province of Misiones, Argentina. It carries the name of prominent politician and diplomat Bernardo de Irigoyen.

Location
The city is located in the easternmost point of Argentina, on the border with Brazil, next to Dionísio Cerqueira (state of Santa Catarina) and Barracão (state of Paraná), an important entrance to the country. It lies on Barracón Hill, at an altitude of 835 m, the highest point in Misiones, by National Route 14, which connects the Argentine Mesopotamia with other regions.

The municipality contains part of the  Urugua-í Provincial Park, created in 1990.

Climate
Bernardo de Irigoyen has a humid subtropical climate with abundant rainfall in every season (Cfa in Köppen climate classification), closely bordering a subtropical highland climate (Cfb) as the hottest month averages exactly ).

References

 

Populated places in Misiones Province
Populated places established in 1921
Cities in Argentina
Argentina
Misiones Province